KXOT (106.3 MHz) is a commercial FM radio station located in Los Lunas, New Mexico, broadcasting to the Albuquerque, New Mexico area.

KXOT broadcasts at 100,000 watts from a site near Los Lunas and covers Albuquerque from the south, and also serves communities in Valencia County and Central New Mexico. KXOT is owned by Vanguard Media and airs a Regional Mexican format branded as "La Mexicana 106.3".

History

Beginnings
An original construction permit for this station was granted in September 1990 under call sign KZPY. It was licensed to Patricia Komorowski, and would be launched by Guardian Communications under an LMA in January 1995, along with an upgrade to KLVO (97.7 FM). Two months later, Guardian would purchase the station for $210,000.

Prior to the construction of this facility, the 106.3 frequency in Albuquerque was used by translator K292EN owned by Double Eagle Broadcasting of Cordova, Tennessee, which had initially aired KMXQ in Socorro; by about the Spring of 1992, 106.3 FM would simulcast KZRQ (105.1 FM), which was an affiliate of the "Z-Rock" network at the time.

Rhythm Driven 106-3
In January 1995, 106.3 FM would officially launch with a "Dance and Romance" format with the calls KDNR. The format would become a dance-heavy Top 40/CHR, branded as "Rhythm Driven 106-3", a few months later. In September 1996, Guardian Communications of Cincinnati announced the sale of its stations, including the Albuquerque cluster of KDNR, KLVO, KKIM and KARS. The stations were sold to American General Media for $5.5 million in early 1998, shortly after KDNR shifted to Rhythmic Top 40.

Wild 106
In the summer of 1997, KDNR took the calls KYLZ-FM, which were previously used by KSQL in Santa Cruz, California from 1994-1996 and using the same moniker and rhythmic CHR format as "Wild 107-7"; however, there is no evidence that there was ever any connection between the two stations. The new station was branded as "Wild 106", and went head-to-head with KKSS, which had been very popular with local youth for much of the 1990s. The two stations would often be in a fierce battle for hip-hop listeners over the next seven years. KKSS had shifted to mainstream top 40 in early 2001, making KYLZ the lone rhythmic contemporary station for nearly two years. However, KKSS returned to rhythmic in late 2002 after changing ownership, putting the two stations in direct competition once again, with KKSS eventually reclaiming the top spot in the format.

Talk FM
In late 2004, American General Media had opted to challenge the markets' top rated station KKOB after morning host Larry Ahrens had signed with the company. KYLZ-FM was selected as the station to house a new news/talk format; therefore, "Wild 106" came to an end in February 2005. ("Wild" was revived in December 2007 as KDLW on 97.7 FM, but had not been an effective competitor with KKSS as KYLZ was. After KAGM launched a new hip-hop format in July 2009, Wild 97.7 became known as "OMG! Radio" on August 24, 2009 with a mainstream top 40 format.) In March 2005, KYLZ-FM officially flipped to the new format under new KAGM call letters.

In addition to Ahrens, other local hosts who would be featured on KAGM included Dianne Anderson, who had just left her TV news anchor job at KOAT. She would host an afternoon talk show on KAGM, later joined by her husband Mark Mathis. The late afternoon "drive time" featured Chris Jackson, who was KKOB's afternoon host during the late 1990s, and Phil "The Bean" Sisneros, formerly the longtime morning show host on KKOB-FM until late 2002 (at the time of that station's switch to mainstream top 40). National talk radio hosts Glenn Beck and Rusty Humphries originally filled the midday and nighttime slots, but the station had numerous line-up changes during its run. However, the station achieved low Arbitron ratings and appeared to have little or no impact on KKOB. In 2006, Jackson and Sisneros were let go and replaced with a couple of previously unknown hosts, while Dianne Anderson joined Larry Ahrens in morning drive, but later returned to television, taking a new anchor job at KRQE. The format ended on September 29, 2006, and was replaced with a temporary simulcast of sister station KZNM's Spanish-language oldies format.

The Range
KAGM flipped to classic country on October 4, 2006 as "The Range". The "Range" branding was formerly on two other area stations under the KKRG-FM call letters: on 101.3 FM from December 2001 until November 2002, and on 105.1 FM from April 2004 until March 2006.

Power 106
On July 20, 2009, at 1:06 p.m., KAGM flipped formats to Rhythmic CHR and adopted the "Power 106" moniker. With this move, AGM had two Rhythmic outlets in the same radio market, the other being KDLW; this arrangement temporarily lasted until that August 24, when it switched directions to Mainstream Top 40/CHR. In late 2010, "Power" began to mix current rhythmic hits with old-school hip hop/R&B using a new slogan "Today and Back in the Day". Mornings originally featured the syndicated Big Boy's Neighborhood. However, in October 2011, KAGM replaced Big Boy with Double J to take over the morning show. As of July 2012, "Power" has begun to mix more urban material into their library.

On March 28, 2013, it was announced that "Power" was moving to 106.7 FM at 8 a.m. on April 1, in order to take advantage of a stronger signal. With the switch, the station was rebranded as "Power 106.7".

Z106.3
At the same time as the move of "Power" to 106.7 FM, 106.3 FM took over KDLW's Top 40/CHR format and relaunched it as "Z106.3, Hit Music Now." (However, despite a banner on its webpage leading up to the switchover, KDLW did not do any announcements or promotions towards the switch, and in the hours before, they were running jockless.) On April 4, 2013, KAGM and KDLW swapped call letters. For three months after the launch, the station had no social media presence and its webpage only featured a white background with standard lettering with a link to its web stream. In addition, the station continued to run sweepers telling "Power" listeners to tune in to 106.7 FM for many months. By early July 2013, it had updated its webpage and revived the "OMG! Radio" Facebook page with the updated logo.

The "Z" format was a successor to the former "OMG! Radio" that aired from 2009-2011 on 97.7 FM and on 106.7 FM from 2011-2013. The "OMG!" airstaff, however, were not moved to the new station, which had been running jockless for the first year. It later added personalities which included Ashley V (now at KKSS), Rico Rich and k-dawg (now at KOBQ). In February 2016, the syndicated Johnjay & Rich morning show was added.

On June 14, 2017, AGM announced that it would acquire Univision's entire Albuquerque cluster (which includes rival KKSS, as well as KKRG and KIOT). To meet ownership limits set by the Federal Communications Commission, AGM would spin off KDLW to BB Broadcasting, owned by real estate developer Tom Buzzuto, for $750,000. Following acquisition, the station would be programmed by Vanguard Media, owners of contemporary jazz station KOAZ and newly acquired KJFA-FM, via a time brokerage agreement. The sale was consummated on September 1, 2017.

On April 29, 2019, Vanguard Media turned the time brokerage agreement into a purchase of the station for $850,000. The purchase was consummated on June 25, 2019.

Regional Mexican formats
On May 4, 2020, KDLW dropped the Top 40/CHR format and began stunting with sweepers coinciding with Cinco de Mayo. The next day, KDLW flipped to Regional Mexican, branded as "La Zeta 106.3".and focused on being "100% local", while featuring a variety of Regional Mexican music genres.

On September 1, 2020, KDLW expanded its broadcast to KSFE (96.7 FM) in Grants and translator K240EC (95.9 FM) in Santa Fe, replacing smooth jazz-formatted KOAZ.

On January 3, 2022, KDLW rebranded as "Exitos 106.3", described as "Regional Mexican CHR". The simulcast on KSFE was also discontinued. Rebroadcasts were also aired on KVVD 1100 AM (now KRKE) and translator K229CL 93.7 until October 10, 2022. 

On August 23, 2022, the station changed the call letters to KXOT. Shortly after the station rebranded again as "La Mexicana 106.3".

Former logos

References

External links

XOT
Radio stations established in 1995
1995 establishments in New Mexico
Regional Mexican radio stations in the United States
XOT